Frédéric Firmenich (23 December 1874 – 5 January 1953) was a Swiss sailor. He competed in the 6 Metre event at the 1936 Summer Olympics.

References

External links
 

1874 births
1953 deaths
Swiss male sailors (sport)
Olympic sailors of Switzerland
Sailors at the 1936 Summer Olympics – 6 Metre
Sportspeople from Geneva